Aeronautes is a genus of swifts in the family Apodidae.

It contains the following species:
 White-throated swift (Aeronautes saxatalis)
 White-tipped swift (Aeronautes montivagus)
 Andean swift (Aeronautes andecolus)

 
Bird genera

Taxonomy articles created by Polbot